Literary presses are publishing companies that publish books with a literary or artistic emphasis. This is a list of publishing companies and imprints whose primary emphasis is on literature and the arts. It does not include exclusively online publishers, academic publishers (who often publish very limited print runs, but for a different market), or businesses operating solely as printers, such as print-on-demand companies or vanity presses.

List of English-language literary presses

 Algonquin Books
 Arte Publico Press
 Atlantic Books
 Bellevue Literary Press
 Blackwell Publishers
 Coffee House Press  
 Etruscan Press
 Faber and Faber
 Four Walls Eight Windows
 Gival Press
 Graywolf Press
 Harbor Mountain Press
 Hippocampus Press
 Inanna Publications
 Legend Press
 Mercury House
 Milkweed Editions
 Moschatel Press
 New Rivers Press
 Picador, a division of Henry Holt and Company
 Sarabande Books
 Small Beer Press
 Southwick House
 Tarpaulin Sky Press
 TSAR Publications
 Tupelo Press
 Turnstone Press 
 Two Dollar Radio
 Unnamed Press
 Washington Writers Publishing House

See also

List of English-language small presses
List of English-language book publishing companies

References 

English Language Literary Presses